Carl John Judge (born 14 June 1968) is an Australian politician. He served as a member of the Queensland Legislative Assembly from 2012 to 2015. He was elected as a member of the Liberal National Party, but quit the party to sit as an independent on 29 November 2012. He then joined the new United Australia Party (UAP) on 30 April 2013,.  The UAP was subsequently rebranded as the Palmer United Party and Judge later became an independent again on 8 October 2014.

Political career
Judge defeated Simon Finn at the 2012 state election and is the first Liberal/Liberal National Party member to hold the seat, formerly called Yeronga, since 1989. Judge was appointed to the Queensland Parliament's Member, Legal Affairs and Community Safety Committee on 18 May 2012.  He also served as a member of the Transport, Housing and Local Government Committee and was appointed to the Select Committee on Ethics.

References

External links
 Carl Judge, Queensland Parliament member biography

Liberal National Party of Queensland politicians
Independent members of the Parliament of Queensland
United Australia Party (2013) politicians
1968 births
Living people
Members of the Queensland Legislative Assembly
Australian police officers
21st-century Australian politicians